The Château de la Petite Filolie is a château in Condat-sur-Vézère, Dordogne, Nouvelle-Aquitaine, France. It stands on the River Vézère directly opposite the Château de la Fleunie.

References

Châteaux in Dordogne